The Death Race series is a car combat franchise encompassing a series of films and other media centered on a reality show set in a prison, where inmates race against each other in order to win their freedom.

Films

Death Race 2000 (1975)

Death Race 2000 is a 1975 cult action film. In the near future, the ultimate sporting event is the Death Race. Contestants score points for running people down as they speed across the country. The sport has crazed fans who sacrifice themselves to the drivers. A covert group is trying to bring an end to the immoral Death Race and has infiltrated one of their followers into the race as a navigator of the top driver. In the end, the lives of the competitors, the President and the Death Race itself are in peril.

The screenplay was based on the short story "The Racer" by Ib Melchior.

Death Race (2008)

Death Race is a 2008 remake (although director Paul W. S. Anderson stated in the DVD commentary that he thought of the film as a prequel) of Death Race 2000.
In the year 2012, the economy of the US collapses, causing unemployment and crime rates to skyrocket, and a sharp increase of convicted criminals, which leads to privatized prisons for profit. Claire Hennessey (Joan Allen), the warden of Terminal Island Penitentiary, earns profits from the pay-per-view broadcast of a modern gladiator game called the "Death Race", with the prisoners as the players. The racers, along with their navigators, drive a three-part race over three days on a closed track at Terminal Island, with various pressure plates: swords activate the racers' offensive weapons, shields activate defensive weapons such as oil, smoke, and napalm, and skulls ("Death Heads") activate deadly metal traps which rise up from the track. The reward for the drivers is that if one racer wins five races, they will be granted their freedom by Warden Hennessey.

Death Race 2 (2010)

Death Race 2 is a prequel to the 2008 film Death Race. Getaway driver Carl "Luke" Lucas (Luke Goss) is arrested after a robbery for his crime boss Markus Kane (Sean Bean) goes wrong. As his accomplices are robbing the bank, two police officers casually enter the building. Luke tells his accomplices to abort, but they refuse; Luke intervenes, resulting in the death of one of the three accomplices. Luke shoots and kills one of the officers and dumps off his accomplices in order to fulfill Markus's wishes. In doing so, Luke is eventually captured by the police following a high-speed chase and sentenced to serve time on Terminal Island. Markus, worried that Luke will trade info on his crimes for immunity, discovers his location and orders his men to take Luke out.

Death Race 3: Inferno (2013)

Death Race owner R. H. Weyland (Ving Rhames) has been forced to sell the rights to Niles York (Dougray Scott), a British billionaire who acquired the rights by hostile takeover. York reveals that he intends to relocate the Death Race to the deserts of Africa. Before leaving, Weyland arranges Lucas to have surgery to heal the infected and deadly scars on his face sustained from the previous film Death Race 2. With Carl Lucas, a.k.a. Frankenstein (Luke Goss), one win away from gaining his freedom, York coaches Lucas to lose his race and threatens his life if he fails to comply.

Death Race 2050 (2017)

Corman made Death Race 2050, a sequel to his original film, shooting in Peru starting in February 2016. It stars Malcolm McDowell, Manu Bennett, Burt Grinstead, Marci Miller, Folake Olowofoyeku, Anessa Ramsey, Yancy Butler, and Charlie Farrell, and was directed by G. J. Echternkamp. The film was released in the United States on DVD and DVD/Blu-ray combo on Jan 17, 2017, with three making-of documentaries: The Making of 2050, Cars! Cars! Cars!, and The Look of 2050.

Death Race: Beyond Anarchy (2018)

Death Race: Beyond Anarchy is a sequel to the 2008 film Death Race, directed by Don Michael Paul and features the return of Danny Trejo and Frederick Koehler. It also stars Zach McGowan, Christine Marzano, Danny Glover, and Lorina Kamburova.

Cast and crew

Principal cast

Additional crew

Other media

Unrelated
Deathsport is a 1978 science fiction B-movie produced by Roger Corman, directed by Allan Arkush and Nicholas Niciphor.

Comic books 
A comic book sequel series titled Death Race 2020 was published in April–November 1995 by Roger Corman's short-lived Roger Corman's Cosmic Comics imprint. It was written by Pat Mills of 2000 AD fame, with art by Kevin O'Neill. The pair had already worked together on several comics, including Marshal Law. The comic book series, as the title indicates, takes place 20 years after the film ended and deals with Frankenstein's return to the race. New racers introduced here included Von Dutch, the Alcoholic, Happy the Clown, Steppenwolf, Rick Rhesus and Harry Carrie.

The comic book series lasted eight issues before being cancelled and the story was left unfinished at the end.

Video games
 The 1976 video game Death Race was inspired by the film Death Race 2000. A remake of the same name was released in 1990 for the Nintendo Entertainment System.
 The video game Maze Death Race, released in 1982 for the ZX81 and in 1983 for the ZX Spectrum, resembles the film by its cover artwork, title, and car-driving content.
 The Carmageddon video game series borrows heavily from the plot, characters, and car designs from the film Death Race 2000.

Alien franchise

In Death Race 2 (2010) and Death Race 3: Inferno (2013), the character R. H. Weyland (played by Ving Rhames), is the founder of the Weyland Corporation, the company who owns the Terminal Island Penitentiary from the 2008 film. The company is mentioned in the remake series, an allusion to the Alien franchise (despite the involvement of Paul W. S. Anderson, who is the director of Alien vs. Predator (2004), who also directed Death Race and co-wrote the 2008 film's prequels).

Television
The 2017 TV show Blood Drive also draws from the Death Race series. Instead of killing people to earn points, people are sacrificed to the cars' engines, which have been modified to run off human blood.

References

External links

 
Film series introduced in 1975
British film series
American chase films
American dystopian films
Films shot in Montreal
Relativity Media films
Universal Pictures films
Cruise/Wagner Productions films
German road movies
Fiction set in prison
Action film franchises